The 1972 Italian Grand Prix was a Formula One motor race held at Monza on 10 September 1972. It was race 10 of 12 in both the 1972 World Championship of Drivers and the 1972 International Cup for Formula One Manufacturers.

Before the race, the Monza circuit was modified with the addition of two chicanes, one before the Curva Grande and one at the site of the old Curva Vialone, in order to reduce speeds in the interests of safety. Team Lotus was forced to run only one car because Emerson Fittipaldi's Lotus 72D was seriously damaged in an accident while being transported to Monza. Fittipaldi raced another 72D, but with specifications very close to the 1970 model

The 55-lap race was won by Brazilian driver Emerson Fittipaldi, driving a Lotus-Ford, after he started from sixth position. With the win, Fittipaldi sealed the Drivers' Championship, becoming the youngest ever champion at 25 years and 273 days until superseded by Fernando Alonso at 24 years and 59 days in 2005; Lotus also secured the Manufacturers' Cup. Englishman Mike Hailwood finished second in a Surtees-Ford, with New Zealander Denny Hulme third in a McLaren-Ford.

The race marked the last win for American tyre manufacturer Firestone in Formula One. It was also the last race in which 1964 World Champion John Surtees competed.

Classification

Qualifying

*Entries with a red background failed to qualify.

Race

Championship standings after the race 

Drivers' Championship standings

Constructors' Championship standings

Note: Only the top five positions are included for both sets of standings.

References

Italian Grand Prix
Italian Grand Prix
1972 in Italian motorsport
Italian Grand Prix